Crossidius mexicanus is a species of beetle in the family Cerambycidae. It was described by Chemsak & Noguera in 1997.

References

Trachyderini
Beetles described in 1997